Carolyn Therese Male (born 7 May 1966) is an Australian politician who was a Labor member of the Legislative Assembly of Queensland from 2001 to 2012.

Male was first elected to parliament as the Labor member for Glass House at the 2001 state election. She served three terms as the member for Glass House, but a redistribution ahead of the 2009 state election made the district much less favourable for Labor. Consequently, she successfully contested the seat of Pine Rivers to win a fourth term.

She was Government Whip from 11 September 2006 to 8 April 2009. Male was the Parliamentary Secretary for Education from March 2009 until she was made a Deputy Government Whip in February 2012. Male retired before the 2012 election. Male was born in Nambour. She is married with two daughters.

References

                   

1966 births
Living people
Members of the Queensland Legislative Assembly
People from Nambour, Queensland
Australian Labor Party members of the Parliament of Queensland
21st-century Australian politicians
21st-century Australian women politicians
Women members of the Queensland Legislative Assembly